"Suit & Tie" is a song by American singer-songwriter Justin Timberlake from his third studio album The 20/20 Experience (2013). It features a skit from American rapper Jay-Z. It was written and produced by Timberlake, Tim "Timbaland" Mosley and Jerome "J-Roc" Harmon, with additional writing from James Fauntleroy and Shawn "Jay-Z" Carter. It features compositional samples from the 1972 song "Sho' Nuff" by Sly, Slick and Wicked, which members are credited as co-writers to "Suit & Tie". The song was premiered on YouTube on January 13, 2013, and was released on January 15 by RCA Records as the lead single from the album. It serves as Timberlake's highly anticipated musical comeback following a six-year hiatus, during which time he pursued an acting career and developed his skills as a record producer and songwriter for other artists.

Musically, "Suit & Tie" is a mid-tempo R&B song, that incorporates a "slow-drawl" consisting of slowed down synths and "slightly out of time" drum claps, similar to the chopped and screwed remixing style. Lyrically, the song is an ode to the joys of "being handsome and well-dressed". Upon release the song was met with positive reviews from critics who praised both the song and Timberlake from representing R&B in a way that many contemporary songs cannot. Commercially "Suit & Tie" was a success selling 315,000 first-week downloads in the US, surpassing the 250,000 debut of "SexyBack" in 2006 and becoming Timberlake's highest sales week for a download at the time—until the release of "Can't Stop the Feeling!" in 2016. The song went on to peak at number three on the US Billboard Hot 100. The song also charted within the top five of both the UK and Canadian charts, peaking at three in both regions respectively. As of 2018, it has sold 3.3 million downloads in the US.

An accompanying music video for "Suit & Tie" was shot on January 25, 2013 and was directed by David Fincher, with whom Timberlake had previously worked with in The Social Network. To promote the song, Timberlake and Jay-Z performed "Suit & Tie" at the 55th Annual Grammy Awards on February 10, 2013. They performed the song again during Timberlake's hosting of Saturday Night Live on March 9, 2013. The music video was released on Timberlake's Vevo page on Valentine's Day 2013. It won the Grammy Award for Best Music Video at the 2014 ceremony.

Background 

In September 2006, Timberlake released his second studio album FutureSex/LoveSounds. Well-received both critically and commercially, the album spawned six singles, including the worldwide hits "SexyBack", "My Love" and "What Goes Around... Comes Around". After wrapping up a worldwide concert tour in support of the album in 2007, Timberlake took a break from his music career to focus on acting. In addition, Timberlake worked behind-the-scenes with his record label Tennman Records (founded in 2007) and his production team The Y's (founded in 2008). He also provided guest vocals on several singles by other artists, such as "4 Minutes" by Madonna and "Carry Out" by Timbaland. In June 2011, Timberlake and Specific Media Group jointly purchased Myspace for approximately $35 million. Timberlake promised to put in the work to make Myspace, a once-dominant social network pioneer that "fell on hard times", relevant again.

In August 2012, producer Jim Beanz reported that Timberlake had started working on his new music project. However, shortly after the announcement, Timberlake's publicist revealed that there were no current plans for a new Timberlake album, affirming instead that Timberlake was working with Timbaland on songs for his upcoming project Shock Value III.

Release 

In early January 2013, via his official Twitter account, Timberlake posted a tweet, "I think I'M READY", before posting a link to a YouTube video which shows him walking into a studio and explains his absence from releasing new songs. In the minute-long video, a camera follows Timberlake as he walks through a recording studio, while the singer's voice-over discusses why it's been so long between albums. In the video, he reveals that he is not interested in releasing something he doesn't love. The video closes with Timberlake entering a recording booth, putting on headphones and saying, "I'm ready." Subsequently, on the singer's official site, a countdown leading up to Monday, January 14 at 12 a.m. ET appeared, and so there was speculation of a new single and album to break Timberlake's hiatus. That timing coincided with a tweet that Power 105.1 radio personality Charlamagne posted, saying, "Justin, Jay-Z Timbaland. New record Monday".

Following months of private beta testing, Myspace was relaunched on January 15. The front page of the site featured an image of Timberlake wearing a suit and tie. In addition, a chance to stream or download "Suit & Tie" for joining or signing into Myspace was given. Wired magazine wrote that by doing this, the site, which was completely revamped to focus on "assisting artists in sharing their music with passionate fans", is sending a "clear message" about what the network is good for: "posting music for free, and trying to upsell it to downloads".

Writing and inspiration 
"Suit & Tie" was written by Timberlake, Timbaland, Shawn "Jay-Z" Carter, Jerome "J-Roc" Harmon and James Fauntleroy. According to Timberlake: "The inspiration for this really came out of the blue and to be honest, I didn't expect anything out of it. I just went into the studio and started playing around with some sounds and songs. It was probably the best time I've had in my career... Just creating with no rules and/or end goal in mind and really enjoying the process."

Composition 

"Suit & Tie" is a mid-tempo R&B song, with a length of five minutes and 26 seconds (5:26). The song, written in the key of D major, begins with a "slow-drawl" intro consisting of slowed down synths and "slightly out of time" drum claps, reminiscent of the Chopped and Screwed style of DJing. A distorted Timbaland growls "awoo", before he and Timberlake sing: "I be on my suit and tie shit". After a brief pause the song then settles into a "rolling, laidback" groove that contains finger clicks and old-school horn blasts that add a layer of sophistication to the track. Timbaland's "shiny collection" of percussion congeals on the track. Jay-Z's appearance is a single verse which appears roughly two thirds of the way into the track.

The song features heavily usage of music samples from Sly, Slick and Wicked's 1972 recording "Sho' Nuff", produced by James Brown. The sound effect used in the beat is also similar to that of the track "Ya Mama" by The Pharcyde. The song also follows similar musical patterns of the 1986 song "Guinnevere" by Valerie Dore off of her LP, The Legend.

"Suit & Tie" is a sleek dance number with several start-stop components arranged in a way similar to his debut single "Like I Love You" (2002). Jim Farber of the New York Daily News wrote that the song is in the "classic" style of Curtis Mayfield, yet "isn't in any way conventionally retro". The song "floats along" like a song from The Whispers, but according to Melinda Newman of HitFix, Timbaland's production manages to pay homage without sounding dated. The song then goes into a hypnotic, engaging outro before a great, cold ending. Lyrically, the song is an ode to the joys of "being handsome and well-dressed".

Critical reception 

The song received positive reviews upon release. Michael Cragg of The Guardian wrote that "Suit & Tie" feels like the work of someone "luxuriating in the fact they're making music again" and not someone "desperate to redefine pop in the face of its recent club-related slump". He stated that the song is not a "sound-redefining, statement-making, globe-conquering comeback single" like "SexyBack" (2006) was, but "more of a midway point" between his previous singles "Señorita" and "Summer Love". A reviewer from The Independent wrote that Timberlake appears to have "gone up an octave" since he last released new music. The reviewer also compared the song to "Rock Your Body" and "SexyBack". Stephen Deusner of Pitchfork awarded the track their Best New Track tag, praising Timberlake's vocal performance and Timbaland's production by saying, "Timbaland creates a smooth beat out of a marimba roll and harp glissando that Marvin Gaye must have left on the cutting-room floor, and Timberlake rides it with that fluid, effortless falsetto." Deusner, however, noted that the feature verse from Jay-Z is "another in a string of uninspired cameos," but it couldn't "sink the song's slinky vibe." Popjustice, in the same vein, claimed that the song was "officially, and very disappointingly, mediocre" and "it could make a decent third single from an album, if they were struggling".

Melinda Newman of HitFix said to "leave it to Timberlake" to represent R&B in a way that "few contemporary artists are today", noting Bruno Mars and Miguel being a few exceptions. She also wrote that it is "more of a statement that Timberlake is back than a catchy, hit song. And that's fine. Artists don't lead with their strongest stuff. As re-introductions go, it's a good place to start and he can build to what we hope are some catchier songs on the album". Kia Makarechi of The Huffington Post wrote that "Our expectations are our greatest enemy. ... If we ditch the notion that Justin needs to reinvent dance music every time he drops an album (a tall order for any artist), 'Suit & Tie' may actually give us a lot to look forward to".

Chart performance 
A few hours after its release, "Suit & Tie" reached the top position on the U.S. iTunes Store.  The song debuted at number 84 on the Billboard Hot 100 based on two days of airplay in the week ending January 26, 2013.
"Suit & Tie" also debuted at number 14 on Billboards Pop Songs chart with 6,045 plays, the highest detections total by a new entry in the chart's history. Only Mariah Carey and Taylor Swift debuted higher at number 12 with "Dreamlover" (1993) and "Shake It Off" (2014), respectively; additionally, Swift's "Bad Blood" debuted at number 13. In the United Kingdom, the song debuted at number 3. As of June 2013, "Suit & Tie" has sold 300,000 copies in the United Kingdom.

The following week, "Suit & Tie" jumped to number four on the Billboard Hot 100 with 315,000 first-week downloads sold. It was Timberlake's highest sales week for a download, surpassing the 250,000 debut of "SexyBack" in 2006, but later bested by "Can't Stop the Feeling!" in 2016 with 379,000. "Suit & Tie" then fell to number 13 for two weeks, but returned to the top 10 on the week of February 10, 2013 after Timberlake performed it at the 2013 Grammy Awards. The song reached a new peak at number 3 on the Billboard Hot 100 on its eleventh week due to the album release. The single has reached the number one position on Billboard's Rhythmic Airplay Chart in its April 13, 2013 issue. As of March 2014, the single has sold 3,044,000 downloads in the United States. As of 2018, the song has accumulated 4.6 million units in the country, combining sales (3.3 million downloads) and equivalent streams.

In 2013, "Suit & Tie" was ranked as the 20th most popular song of the year on the Billboard Hot 100.

Music video

Background and release
In 2010, American filmmaker David Fincher directed the drama film The Social Network. In it, Timberlake played Sean Parker and starred together with actors Jesse Eisenberg and Andrew Garfield. Later, the film went on to get a nomination for Best Picture at the 83rd Academy Awards. On February 1, 2013, it was revealed that Fincher is set to direct the video for "Suit & Tie", Timberlake's comeback single. Prior to becoming an Oscar-nominated director, Fincher frequently directed music videos for artists, such as Madonna ("Express Yourself" and "Vogue"), Aerosmith ("Janie's Got a Gun"), George Michael ("Freedom! '90") and A Perfect Circle's Judith. His last directed music video was from 2005 when he directed the music video for the song "Only" by Nine Inch Nails.

The music video for "Suit & Tie" was shot in Los Angeles on January 25, 2013. It was filmed by cinematographer Matthew Libatique with Red Epic equipment. June Ambrose, costume designer and celebrity stylist, outfitted Jay-Z in Tom Ford for the video. The music video was released on Timberlake's Vevo page on Valentine's Day 2013.

The music video has over 160 million views on YouTube as of 2021.

Accolades
"Suit & Tie" won the Grammy Award for Best Music Video at the 56th Annual Grammy Awards. It received two nominations at the 2013 MTV Video Music Awards: Best Collaboration and Best Direction, winning the latter. Rolling Stone named it the third best video of 2013. Pitchfork Media also ranked it among the best music videos of 2013 and half-of-the-decade.

Live performances 

"Suit & Tie" was part of the set list of Justin and Jay-Z's co-headlining Legends of the Summer Tour in 2013. They both performed the song at the 55th Annual Grammy Awards, where Timberlake also performed "Pusher Lover Girl". Timberlake was the host and musical guest of Saturday Night Live episode on March 9, 2013, where he performed "Suit & Tie" with Jay-Z and "Mirrors.".

On August 25, 2013, Timberlake performed "Suit & Tie" in a medley with other of his songs at the 2013 MTV Video Music Awards. The song is part of the set list of Timberlake's 2013/15 The 20/20 Experience World Tour.

A shortened selection of "Suit & Tie" was included in Timberlake's Super Bowl LII halftime show performance in 2018, and featured the University of Minnesota Marching Band playing backup instrumentals.

Track listings 
Digital download
"Suit & Tie" featuring Jay-Z – 5:27

Digital download – Radio Edit
"Suit & Tie" (Radio edit) featuring Jay-Z – 4:29

Credits and personnel 
Engineering and mixing
Engineered at Jungle City Studios, New York City, New York; mixed at Larrabee Studios, North Hollywood, California.

Personnel

Songwriting – Justin Timberlake, Timothy Mosley, Shawn Carter, Jerome "J-Roc" Harmon, James Fauntleroy
Sample – A portion of the composition "Sho Nuff" written by Terrence Stubbs, Johnny Wilson, Charles Still
Production – Timbaland, Justin Timberlake, Jerome "J-Roc" Harmon
Vocal production – Justin Timberlake

Engineered – Chris Godbey
Mixing – Jimmy Douglass, Chris Godbey, Justin Timberlake
Mixing assistant – Matt Weber
Guitar – Elliott Ives
Vocals – Justin Timberlake, Timbaland & JAY-Z
Keyboards – Jerome Harmon

Credits adapted from the liner notes of The 20/20 Experience, RCA Records.

Charts

Weekly charts

Year-end charts

Certifications

Release history

See also 
 List of number-one hits of 2013 (Denmark)

References

External links
 

2013 singles
2012 songs
Justin Timberlake songs
Jay-Z songs
Songs written by Timbaland
Songs written by Justin Timberlake
Songs written by Jerome "J-Roc" Harmon
Songs written by James Fauntleroy
Song recordings produced by Timbaland
Song recordings produced by Justin Timberlake
Song recordings produced by Jerome "J-Roc" Harmon
Number-one singles in Denmark
Music videos directed by David Fincher
Grammy Award for Best Short Form Music Video
Black-and-white music videos
MTV Video Music Award for Best Direction
RCA Records singles